The 2017–18 Southeastern Conference women's basketball season began with practices in October 2017, followed by the start of the 2017–18 NCAA Division I women's basketball season in November. Conference play started in late-December 2017 and concluded in February 2018, followed by the 2018 SEC women's basketball tournament at the Bridgestone Arena in Nashville, Tennessee.

Pre-season

Pre-season team predictions

Pre-season All-SEC teams

Coaches select eight players
Players in bold are choices for SEC Player of the Year

Head coaches

Note: Stats shown are before the beginning of the season. Overall and SEC records are from time at current school.

Weekly rankings

Source:

Regular season matrix
This table summarizes the head-to-head results between teams in conference play.

Attendance

Postseason

SEC tournament

 February 28–March 4 at the Bridgestone Arena, Nashville, Tennessee. Teams were seeded by conference record, with ties broken by record between the tied teams followed by record against the regular season champion, if necessary.

NCAA Division I Women's Basketball tournament

Women's National Invitation tournament

WNBA draft

Honors and awards

All-SEC awards and teams

References

 
Southeastern Conference women's basketball seasons